The following table shows the World Record Progression in the Men's 50 km Walk, as recognised by the IAAF.

World record progression

Note 
The 3:35:29 by Russia's Denis Nizhegorodov set in Cheboksary on June 13, 2004 was not ratified by the IAAF as a World Record because no EPO test was carried out afterwards.

References

Athletix
IOC-site

Walk, 50 km men
Records